The women's tournament in volleyball at the 2008 Summer Olympics was held at Capital Indoor Stadium and Beijing Institute of Technology Gymnasium from 9 to 23 August 2008.

The twelve competing teams were split equally into two pools of six teams. Each team played all other teams in their pool with the winning team gaining 2 points and the losing side 1 point. The top four teams from each pool progressed through to the quarterfinals. The rest of the tournament was a single-elimination bracket, with a bronze medal match held between the two semifinal losers.

A total of 38 matches were played: 15 in each group, 4 quarterfinals, 2 semifinals, 1 bronze medal match, and 1 gold medal match.

Qualification

* The Asian Olympic qualification tournament and the World Olympic Qualification Tournament are combined into one event. The top 3 teams at the tournament will qualify as the medallists of the World Olympic Qualification Tournament while the best Asian team outside the top 3 will qualify as the Asian Olympic Qualification Tournament champion.

Pools composition
Teams were seeded following the Serpentine system according to their ranking as of January 2008.

Twelve qualified nations were drawn into two groups, each consisting of six teams. After a robin-round, the four highest-placed teams in each group advanced to a knock-out round to decide the medals.

Roster

Pool A
 (roster)
 (roster)
 (roster)
 (roster)
 (roster)
 (roster)

Pool B
 (roster)
 (roster)
 (roster)
 (roster)
 (roster)
 (roster)

Preliminary round
All times are China Standard Time (UTC+8).

Pool A

Pool B

Knockout stage
The first four teams in each Preliminary Round pool advanced to the quarterfinals, eight teams in total. The format was as follows:
A1 vs. B4 (first place in pool A vs. fourth place in pool B)
B1 vs. A4
A drawing of lots determined the pairings among A2/A3 and B2/B3. The purpose of this drawing was to prevent a second-place team in a pool from deliberately losing the last game in pool play in order to select an "easier" opponent (in the sense of matchups) in the quarterfinals.

Based on a drawing of lots after the group stage, the United States faced and defeated Italy, while China drew and won against Russia in their quarterfinal matches. The other quarterfinal match-ups were determined by the pool standings. Brazil (pool B winner) played Japan (pool A 4th place). Cuba (pool A winner) played play Serbia (pool B 4th place). Both top seeds went on to defeat their opponents 3–0, thus reaching the semifinals.

In the semifinals, Brazil defeated the host nation and defending champion China, while the United States defeated Cuba. Both semifinal matches were won 3–0.

In the final, Brazil, for the first time in the tournament, lost a set but was able to win the next two sets from the United States to claim the match and the gold medal.
In the third-place match, China defeated Cuba for the bronze medal.

Bracket

All times are China Standard Time (UTC+08:00).

Quarterfinals

Semifinals

Bronze medal match

Gold medal match

Award ceremony

21:50, 23 August 2008

Statistics leaders
Only players whose teams advanced to the quarterfinals are ranked.

Source:

Final standings

Medalists

Individual awards

Most Valuable Player
 
Best Scorer
 
Best Spiker
 
Best Blocker
 
Best Server
 
Best Setter
 
Best Digger
 
Best Receiver
 
Best Libero
 
Fair Play Award:
 
Most Popular Player:

References

External links
FIVB official page
Beijing 2008 at FIVB
Official results (pgs. 2273–2334)

Olympics
Women's tournament
2008 in Chinese women's sport
Women's volleyball in China
Vol